Andy Jones is a game designer who has worked primarily on wargames and board games.

Career
Under the guidance of Warhammer experts Rick Priestley and Andy Jones and Fighting Fantasy and fiction author Marc Gascoigne, an idea evolved under Games Workshop's Black Library division to create a book full of short stories and comics in a format like an Annual publication; the result was Inferno!, a new magazine previewed in White Dwarf #210 (June 1997) and then published the next month (July 1997).

Jones has also worked on Warhammer 40,000 comics for the Black Library, including The Redeemer (with Pat Mills, Wayne Reynolds, and Debbie Gallagher, 4-issue mini-series, tpb, 96 pages, 2000, tpb with 8-page bonus strip, 104 pages, 2003) and with Mark Gascoigne edited Flames of Damnation (various creators, 224 pages, 2005).

References

Board game designers
Living people
Place of birth missing (living people)
Year of birth missing (living people)